The 2010–11 Lebanese Women's Football League was the 4th edition of the Lebanese Women's Football League since its inception in 2008. Three-time defending champions Sadaka won their fourth title.

League table

See also
2010–11 Lebanese Women's FA Cup

References

External links
RSSSF.com

Lebanese Women's Football League seasons
W1
2010–11 domestic women's association football leagues